An orotone or gold tone is one of many types of photographic print which can be made from a negative. An orotone photograph is created by printing a positive on a glass plate precoated with a silver gelatin emulsion. Following exposure and development, the back of the plate is coated with banana oil impregnated with gold-colored pigment, to yield a gold-toned image. Alternatively, the developed glass plate can be gold-leafed by hand with 23-karat gold leaf.  Being printed on glass, orotone images are extremely fragile and often require specialized frames in order to prevent breakage. Other types of prints can be made with the same negative used to make an orotone. Consequently, silver gelatin prints and platinotypes (platinum and palladium prints) are also made by those who produce orotone prints.

Then and now

The making of orotone prints was contemporary art in the early twentieth century. Orotones are often to be seen in interiors associated with the Arts and Crafts movement. Many of these orotones are by the Seattle photographer Edward S. Curtis, who produced hundreds of orotone photographs of Native Americans during his career. Curtis developed the "Curt-Tone", using techniques which he claimed were superior.

Curtis promoted his process as follows:

Sally Larsen (who gold-leafs each developed plate by hand) and Ryan Zoghlin are modern practitioners of orotone photography.

References

External links
 A Virtual Exhibition on Orotone Photographs, Created for the University of Washington Special Collections Division by Christy Hansen, Class of 2011 Museology Graduate Program
 A Curtis orotone.
 A second example.
 A third example (Zoghlin)

Photographic techniques
Contemporary art